The three-striped hemispingus (Microspingus trifasciatus) is a species of bird in the family Thraupidae.

It is found in Bolivia and Peru. Its natural habitat is subtropical or tropical moist montane forests.

References

three-striped hemispingus
Birds of the Peruvian Andes
Birds of the Bolivian Andes
three-striped hemispingus
three-striped hemispingus
Taxonomy articles created by Polbot